Acacia faucium is a tree belonging to the genus Acacia and the subgenus Juliflorae that is native to north eastern Australia.

Description
It has acutely angular and rather scurfy branchlets that are sparsely and minutely haired on young plants. Like most species of Acacia it has phyllodes rather than true leaves. The pods are glabrous and straight with a powdery white coating and thick, yellowish marginal nerves and longitudinally arranged seeds inside.

Distribution
It is endemic to the eastern-central parts of Queensland where it has a disjunct distribution.

See also
List of Acacia species

References

faucium
Flora of Queensland
Taxa named by Leslie Pedley
Plants described in 1999